Tawhid Boys School is the first independent Islamic boys' school in the Stoke Newington area. The school was founded in June 2000 (Rabi-al Awwal 1421). Moulana Yusuf Motala, head and founder of Darul-Uloom, Bury, Greater Manchester, inaugurated the school in September 2000.

The total number of students in Tawhid exceeds 100 between the ages of 10 and 16, with 13 teachers.

The school was established with the aim of providing excellent Islamic and academic education. The school is managed by the Shura, the management committee.  The number of students has increased over the years.

Tawhid means "the oneness of God".

History 
The school was originally based within the premises of North London Mosque Trust but moved to its own premises in November 2001, which have since been expanded several times.

As a response to the 2017 Westminster Attack, the school set up a link with Westminster Abbey and was visited by Dr John Hall, the Dean of Westminster.

References

External links
The school's website
Department for Children, Schools and Families profile of school

Educational institutions established in 2000
Private boys' schools in London
Private schools in the London Borough of Hackney
Islamic schools in London
Stoke Newington
2000 establishments in England